Mohammad Mohammadi may refer to :

 Mohammad Mohammadi (footballer) (born 1977), Iranian football goalkeeper

 Mohammad Mohammadi Gilani (1928–2014), Shiite cleric from Iran

 Mohammad Mohammadi-Malayeri (1911–2002), Iranian historian, linguist, and literary scholar
 Mohammad Reyshahri (1946–2022), also known as Mohammad Mohammadi-Nik, Iranian politician and cleric

 Mohammad Mohammadi (judoka) (born 1991), Iranian judoka